Chandeni is a village in the Charkhi Dadri district of the Indian state of Haryana.

Establishment 
According to(may be) folklore, the village was named after a woman called Chanda (Hindi: चंदा) who arrived here with her family from Bamla (Hindi: बामला) which is also in Bhiwani district. Her background was from the parent village, Jhojhu. The people in this region of Jhojhu and surroundings were (and are) Sangwan, and so were the parents of Chanda. When she got married and shifted to Bamla.She sought support from her brothers who were Sangwans. The brothers backed up Chanda and got her settled in the nearby vacant land. Such a settlement is known as Dhaani in Haryanvi dialect. It was not a big settlement, spare a few houses of Chanda and her sons. The wild animals also used to roam around occasionally as the surroundings was not fully occupied to agricultural land. To protect the Grewal sister Chanda from such dangers of wild animals, two of Chanda's brothers also got shifted to this Dhaani. This brought Sangwan population to the small Grewal family as protectors. Later this area came to be known as "Chanda ki dhaani" or the "Dhaani of Chanda". With the course of time, the name got deformed from " chanda ki dhani", later "chanda dhani" and eventually "Chandaani".

Location and weather 
Chandeni comes under the Badhra tehsil of Charkhi Dadri district. The land is desert. It is extremely hot in summer and experiences reverse conditions in winters.

Demography 
, the village had 551 households with a total population of 2,635 of which 1,365 were male and 1,270 female.

Most of the people here are from the Jat community. Due to large number of Sangwan people residing in nearby area, the major portion of the population has become Sangwans. About 90% of people here are Sangwan and Ahlawat and 10% homes belong to Grewal. Most of the people do not live in the mainland of village, but on the outskirts and the cultivated land of the village. This brings a decline in the population of Chandeni.

Occupation 
A majority of people here belong to ancestral farming. But they also exhibit a special attachment towards the Indian Armed Forces. Most of the male population of the village are either serving or retired Army Personnel at some point of time in their life.Indian Army/Para Military/ Delhi Police/ Haryana police/ NSG/ Civil Services

Agriculture 
There is an acute ground level water shortage due to the weather conditions. An irrigation canal exists but has not held water since 1996. The main method of irrigation is underground, non-submersible water pumps. The potors are kept at the bottom of such dry wells reaching the water level through pipes. The major crops of this area are millet, wheat, sorghum and chickpea.

References 

Villages in Bhiwani district